Harth al-Haidari is a sub-district located in al-Radmah District, Ibb Governorate, Yemen. Harth al-Haidari had a population of 3677 according to the 2004 census.

References 

Sub-districts in Ar Radmah District